Itoldyouiwouldeatyou is a UK based indie-punk band.

Background 

In 2019, they compiled features with Master Peace, TeenSlasher91 & Worstworldproblem. These collaborations contributed to their creation of K.O.#1. The band started when lead singer, Joey Ashworth, decided he wanted to start a musical group that represented people he wanted to be like at college. Ashworth chose the name because he "thought it was funny to make ambiant music but make it sound like a powerviolence band."

Their composition has fluctuated in recent years. 

Their debut album was "Oh Dearism".

Ashworth sings on every song on the album.
The album was released with Alcopop! Records and Failure By Design. The Alternative gave them a "Good" album review in November 2018.  By 2020, it had already racked up hundreds of thousands of plays on streaming platforms.

They have appeared in the Handmade Festival in 2019 and hosted a special showcase at the Great Escape.

References 

Punk rock groups
British music